David Gorosi (born ) is a Solomon Islands male weightlifter, competing in the 85 kg category and representing Solomon Islands at international competitions. He won the silver medal at the 2013 Pacific Mini Games. He participated at the 2014 Commonwealth Games in the 85 kg event.

Major competitions

References

1988 births
Living people
Solomon Islands male weightlifters
Place of birth missing (living people)
Weightlifters at the 2014 Commonwealth Games
Commonwealth Games competitors for the Solomon Islands